Jack Falls "Jock" Hutchison (June 6, 1884 – September 27, 1977) was a Scottish professional golfer.

Hutchison was born in St Andrews, Fife, Scotland, the son of William and Helen (née Falls). His name was registered as John Waters Hutchison, Waters being the maiden name of William's mother. He appears in the 1901 census as John Hutchison, golf caddie. He had an older brother who was also a golf player, Tom Hutchinson. Hutchison later moved to the United States and became a naturalized citizen in 1920. He was known there as Jack Falls Hutchison or John Falls Hutchison. He won two major championships, the PGA Championship in 1920 and the Open Championship at St Andrews in 1921. His 1921 victory was the first by a U.S.-based player; the following year Walter Hagen became the first U.S.-born winner.

In 1937, Hutchison won the inaugural PGA Seniors' Championship at Augusta National Golf Club, and in 1947 he won that event for a second time.

Beginning in 1963, Hutchison was one of the two men who served as honorary starters for The Masters (along with 1908 U.S. Open champion Fred McLeod), until ailments prevented him from hitting one of the honorary tee shots in 1973. His death on September 27, 1977 came just two days before Masters co-founder Clifford Roberts' own death.

Hutchison died at the age of 93 in Evanston, Illinois.  He was inducted into the World Golf Hall of Fame in 2011.

Professional wins

PGA Tour wins (14)
1918 (1) Florida West Coast Open
1920 (4) West Baden Springs Hotel, Illinois Open, Western Open, PGA Championship
1921 (3) White Sulphur Springs Open, The Open Championship, North and South Open
1922 (2) Columbia Country Club Open, Northern California Open
1923 (1) Western Open
1925 (1) Illinois PGA Championship
1926 (1) Illinois PGA Championship
1928 (1) Florida West Coast Open

Other wins
1916 Pennsylvania Open Championship
1917 National Patriotic Tournament
1921 Kinghorn Tournament
1923 Illinois PGA Championship

Senior wins
1937 PGA Seniors' Championship
1947 PGA Seniors' Championship

Major championships

Wins (2)

1 Hutchison defeated Wethered in a 36-hole playoff by nine strokes: Hutchison 74-6=150; Wethered 77-82=159.
Note: The PGA Championship was match play until 1958

Results timeline

NYF = Tournament not yet founded
NT = No tournament
WD = Withdrew
CUT = missed the half-way cut
R64, R32, R16, QF, SF = Round in which player lost in PGA Championship match play
"T" indicates a tie for a place

References

Scottish male golfers
American male golfers
Winners of men's major golf championships
World Golf Hall of Fame inductees
Scottish emigrants to the United States
Naturalized citizens of the United States
Golfers from St Andrews
1884 births
1977 deaths